Lurkmore or Lurkomorye (a portmanteau of Lukomorye and the English online slang "lurk moar") was an informal Russian-language MediaWiki-powered online encyclopedia  focusing on Internet subcultures, folklore, and memes. As of December 17, 2019, Lurkmore contained over 9000 articles. It is one of the most popular humor—as well as internet-meme-related—websites of the Russian Internet.

Since February 24, 2022 (2022 Russian invasion of Ukraine) the website content is no longer available, with only a black screen showing up on all its pages. Recently, "stop the war" written in blue and yellow (national flag colors of Ukraine) appears atop the black screen.

Content and style

Lurkmore was started as a knowledge base of Internet memes centered on 2ch.ru, the first popular Russian-language imageboard. With time, the project evolved to encompass the broader Runet subculture. It has been called an "informal encyclopedia" about everything. Currently, Lurkmore comprises a wide range of articles, but a very considerable share of them is still about the Internet culture.

Lurkmore articles use a distinctive style, distinguishing themselves with a general informality, semiseriousness, sarcasm, the free use of foul language, and impudence, as well as by sharp criticism of the shortcomings of the considered phenomena. The articles are also characterized by a specific slang—"lurkoyaz" (луркояз)—consisting of Internet slang, assorted words used by padonki and Kashchenists, and Lurkmore's own neologisms.

Rules and policies

Audience
A remarkable feature of the project is the concealment of IP addresses of anonymous participants in the editing history of articles for all users except administrators. The inscription of "Anonimus" is displayed instead of an IP address. The registered participants having a flag of the autoconfirmed participant also have an opportunity to leave any editing not under the name, and anonymously.

Fleeting block in Russia
On 11 November 2012, the IP address of Lurkmore.to was added to the Russian Internet blacklist by decision of the Russian Federal Surveillance Service for Mass Media and Communications, making it inaccessible from most Russian ISPs. A Lurkmore.to owner told journalists that he had not received any communication from Roskomnadzor or the Federal Drug Control Service of Russia before the IP address was blacklisted. Lurkmore.to was removed from the blacklist on 13 November 2012 after the website administrators deleted two marijuana-related articles. In 2015 Homak declared on his Facebook profile that the project will be frozen and become a "culture memorial" due to increasing pressure from Roskomnadzor and other law enforcement agencies, and he left Russia due to general development of situation in the country.

Awards
 Finalist of the 2008  in the humor site of the year category.
 Winner of the 2009 ROTOR competition in the humor site of the year category.
 Winner of the 2011 AntiROTOR competition.
 Winner of the 2012 ROTOR competition in the archive site of the year category.
 Winner of four 2012 AntiRotor nominations.
 Winner of the Golden Joker prize, ceremony organized by a humoristic magazine Maxim.

See also 

 Encyclopedia Dramatica
 Know Your Meme
 Uncyclopedia

References

External links 

 
 

MediaWiki websites
Wiki communities
Russian online encyclopedias
Russian comedy websites
Mass media about Internet culture
Russian-language websites
Parodies of Wikipedia